Stachys is a genus of plants, one of the largest in the mint family Lamiaceae. Estimates of the number of species vary from about 300, to about 450. Stachys is in the subfamily Lamioideae and its type species is Stachys sylvatica. The precise extent of the genus and its relationship to other genera in the subfamily are poorly known.

Range and naming
The distribution of the genus covers Europe, Asia, Africa, Australasia and North America. Common names include hedgenettle, heal-all, self-heal, woundwort, betony, and lamb's ears. Wood betony, S. officinalis, was the most important medicinal herb to the Anglo-Saxons of early medieval England.

Stachys was named by Linnaeus in Species Plantarum in 1753. The name is derived from the Greek word σταχυς (stachys), meaning "an ear of grain", and refers to the fact that the inflorescence is often a spike. The name woundwort derives from the past use of certain species in herbal medicine for the treatment of wounds.

Human uses
The Chinese artichoke or Crosne (S. affinis), is grown for its edible tuber. Several species are cultivated as ornamentals. Woolly betony (S. byzantina) is a popular decorative garden plant.

Use by other species
Stachys species are used as food plants by the larvae of some Lepidoptera species, including the moths Coleophora auricella, C. lineolea, and C. wockeella, all recorded on S. officinalis. They are also widely used by the European wool carder bee (Anthidium manicatum), which scrape the hairs from the plant in order to use them for building their nests.

Description

Stachys is a genus of shrubs and annual or perennial herbs. In most species, the leaves are softly hairy. The corolla is 5-lobed with the top lobe forming a 'hood', varying from white to pink, purple, red or pale yellow.

Circumscription
The distinction between Stachys and other genera is unclear and has varied from one author to another. In 2002, a molecular phylogenetic study showed that Stachys officinalis is not closely related to the rest of the genus. This study also found six other genera to be embedded within Stachys as it is currently circumscribed. The embedded genera are Prasium, Phlomidoschema, Sideritis, Haplostachys, Phyllostegia, and Stenogyne.

Fossil record
†Stachys pliocenica fossil seeds are known from Upper Miocene strata of Bulgaria and Pliocene strata of south-eastern Belarus. The fossil seeds are similar to the seeds of Stachys cretica.

Diversity

Selected species include:

Stachys affinis Bunge – Chinese artichoke
Stachys ajugoides Benth. – bugle hedgenettle
Stachys alabamica B.R.Keener & L.J.Davenp. – Alabama hedgenettle
Stachys albens A.Gray – white hedgenettle, whitestem hedgenettle
Stachys albicaulis Lindl.
Stachys alpina L. – alpine woundwort
Stachys annua (L.) L. – annual woundwort
Stachys arvensis L. – staggerweed, field woundwort

Stachys bullata Benth.
Stachys byzantina K.Koch – woolly betony, lamb's ear
Stachys candida Bory & Chaub.
Stachys chamissonis Benth. – great hedge nettle, coastal hedge nettle
Stachys chamissonis var. cooleyae (A.Heller) G.A.Mulligan & D.B.Munro – Cooley's hedge nettle
Stachys chrysantha Boiss. & Heldr.
Stachys citrina Benth.
Stachys clingmanii Small – Clingman's hedge nettle
Stachys coccinea Ortega

Stachys corsica Pers.
Stachys cretica L.
Stachys debilis Kunth
Stachys ehrenbergii Boiss.
Stachys floridana Benth. – Florida hedgenettle, Florida betony
Stachys germanica L. – downy woundwort
Stachys glutinosa L.
Stachys hispida Pursh – rough hedge-nettle
Stachys hyssopifolia Michx.
Stachys iva Griseb.
Stachys lavandulifolia Vahl
Stachys libanotica Benth.
Stachys manantlanensis B.L.Turner
Stachys mexicana Benth. – Mexican hedge nettle
Stachys milanii Magnier

Stachys nelsonii B.R.Keener & L.J.Davenp. – Nelson's hedgenettle
Stachys palustris L. – marsh woundwort, marsh hedge-nettle
Stachys pumila Banks & Sol.
Stachys pycnantha Benth.
Stachys recta L. – yellow woundwort
Stachys riederi Cham.
Stachys rigida Benth. – rough hedgenettle

Stachys sprucei Briq.
Stachys stricta Greene
Stachys sylvatica L. – hedge woundwort
Stachys tenuifolia Willd. – smooth hedgenettle

Formerly placed here
Agastache foeniculum (Pursh) Kuntze (as S. foeniculum Pursh)
Leonurus japonicus Houtt. (as S. artemisia Lour.)
Stachys monieri (Gouan) P.W.Ball, now in the synonymy of Betonica officinalis
Betonica macrantha K.Koch (as S. macrantha (K.Koch) Stearn)
Betonica officinalis L. (as S. officinalis (L.) Trevis.)

References

External links

Stachys At:Index Nominum Genericorum At: References At: NMNH Department of Botany
Stachys In: Species Plantarum At: Biodiversity Heritage Library

Stachys
Lamiaceae genera
Taxa named by Carl Linnaeus